Face Blind is a suspense novel penned by author Raymond Benson, published by Twenty First Century Publishers Ltd. in 2003.  Benson is mostly known as the author of several James Bond continuation novels.

2003 novels